It Had to Happen is a 1936 American drama film starring George Raft and Rosalind Russell.  The movie was written by Kathryn Scola, and Howard Ellis Smith, and directed by Roy Del Ruth. It is based on the 1909 short story "Canavan, the Man Who Had His Way" by Rupert Hughes.

Plot
An Italian, Enrico Scaffa, emigrates to America where he has a run-in with Beatrice, the elegant wife of a wealthy banker. Enrico gets a job working for a politician and works his way up to be a power in the city. Despite romancing his secretary Miss Sullivan, he crosses with Beatrice again and pursues her.

Cast
George Raft as Enrico Scaffa
Rosalind Russell as Beatrice Nunes
Leo Carrillo as Giuseppe
Arline Judge as Miss Sullivan
Alan Dinehart as Rodman Dreke
Arthur Hohl as John Pelkey

Production
Raft's casting was announced in September 1935. He was borrowed from Paramount. The same month Roy Del Ruth was announced as director. Leo Carillo was borrowed from Columbia. Constance Bennett was mentioned as a possible female lead.

Filming started November 1935.

Reception
The film was a box office hit.

It was one of several films Raft made for Daryl F. Zanuck.

References

External links

 
It Had to Happen at Letterbox DVD
Review of film at Variety

1936 films
1930s English-language films
1936 drama films
American black-and-white films
Films directed by Roy Del Ruth
American drama films
Films produced by Darryl F. Zanuck
Films based on works by Rupert Hughes
20th Century Fox films
Films based on short fiction
Films scored by Arthur Lange
Films with screenplays by Kathryn Scola
1930s American films
English-language drama films